Chlorbenside (C13H10Cl2S), also known as chlorparaside and chlorsulfacide, is a pesticide. It is used as an acaricide being used to kill mites and ticks.

References

Chloroarenes
Pesticides
Thioethers